Gay Culverhouse (February 5, 1947 – July 1, 2020) was president of the Tampa Bay Buccaneers from 1991 to 1994 while her father, Hugh Culverhouse, owned the team. Inspired by Tom McHale, a former Buccaneers player who suffered from chronic traumatic encephalopathy, Culverhouse founded the Gay Culverhouse Players Outreach Program, which helps retired NFL players access earned benefits from the National Football League. Culverhouse is the author of Throwaway Players: The Concussion Crisis from Pee Wee Football to the NFL.

In 1996, she served a brief term as president of Notre Dame College in South Euclid, Ohio. She died on July 1, 2020, at age 73 of complications of myelofibrosis.

References

External links
Radio Interview With Gay Culverhouse Regarding NFL Concussions and her recent book "Throw Away Players: The Concussion Crisis"- Miller on Sports Radio

1947 births
2020 deaths
Sportspeople from Montgomery, Alabama
Writers from Montgomery, Alabama
University of Florida alumni
Columbia University alumni
Tampa Bay Buccaneers executives
Notre Dame College (Ohio)
Heads of universities and colleges in the United States